Chrétien: The Will to Win is the first volume of Lawrence Martin's two-part biography of Jean Chrétien. It details Chrétien's early life and career, before becoming a politician. Martin examines some of the characteristics of the young Jean Chrétien and how they impacted him as a Prime Minister.

See also
List of books about prime ministers of Canada

References

Books about Jean Chrétien
Canadian political books